There are seven statistical regions of Hungary created in 1999 by the Law 1999/XCII amending Law 1996/XXI. Regions are groupings of the 19 counties and the capital city.

Northern Hungary includes the counties Borsod-Abaúj-Zemplén, Heves and Nógrád.
Northern Great Plain includes the counties Hajdú-Bihar, Jász-Nagykun-Szolnok, and Szabolcs-Szatmár-Bereg.
Southern Great Plain includes the counties Bács-Kiskun, Békés and Csongrád-Csanád.
Central Hungary includes the county of Pest and the capital Budapest.
Central Transdanubia includes the counties Komárom-Esztergom, Fejér and Veszprém.
Western Transdanubia includes the counties Győr-Moson-Sopron, Vas, Zala.
Southern Transdanubia includes the counties Baranya, Somogy and Tolna.

Euroregions
Hungary belongs into the following euroregions:
 Carpathian Euroregion: Borsod-Abaúj-Zemplén, Szabolcs-Szatmár-Bereg, Hajdú-Bihar, Jász-Nagykun-Szolnok, Heves
 West Pannonia Euroregion: Győr-Moson-Sopron, Vas, Zala
 Danube-Drava-Sava: Baranya
 Danube-Kris-Mures-Tisza (DKMT): Bács-Kiskun, Békés, Csongrád-Csanád, Jász-Nagykun-Szolnok
 Ister-Granum Euroregion: Komárom-Esztergom, Nógrád

(Counties sometimes only roughly correspond to euroregions, so overlap is possible.)

See also
 Counties of Hungary
 Districts of Hungary (from 2013)
 Subregions of Hungary (until 2013)
 Administrative divisions of the Kingdom of Hungary (until 1918)
 Counties of the Kingdom of Hungary
 Administrative divisions of the Kingdom of Hungary (1941–44)
 List of cities and towns of Hungary
 NUTS:HU
Region (Europe)
Nomenclature of Territorial Units for Statistics

References

 

Regions